Cossar is a surname. Notable people with the surname include:

George Payne Cossar (1907–1992), American lawyer and politician
James Cossar Ewart (1851–1933), Scottish zoologist
John Cossar (1858–1935), English actor
Rose Cossar (born 1991), Canadian gymnast

See also
Cossart